This Mother's Daughter is a 1976 studio album by Nancy Wilson. Produced by Eugene McDaniels, the album is more jazz-funk and jazz-fusion oriented than Wilson's earlier records, and features musicians such as Blue Mitchell, Steve Gadd, Dave Grusin, George Duke, and Hugh McCracken. Grusin serves as arranger for most of the tracks, with additional arrangements by Duke and McCracken. This Mother's Daughter is Wilson's first album with all 10-tracks being original songs. The album's themes are centered on love, relationships and motherhood.

In an AllMusic review, Jason Ankeny calls This Mother's Daughter "the most soulful record cut by Nancy Wilson during her Capitol tenure," and says that McDaniels' "subtle but ingenious jazz-funk flourishes are essential to the project's immediacy and appeal." Ankeny hails Wilson's performance as "sophisticated yet saucy."

Track listing

Side 1 

 "From You To Me To You" (Rachel Perry) – 3:54
 "Love Has Smiled on Us" (Jon Mayer, Perry) – 3:48
 "I Don't Want a Sometimes Man" (Perry) – 3:48
 "Tree of Life" (Eugene McDaniels) – 4:19
 "China" (Dennis Collins Johnson, McDaniels, John Wood) – 3:40

Side 2 

 "Now" (Mayer, Marcia Hillman) – 4:54 
 "This Mother's Daughter" (McDaniels) – 3:55 
 "He Never Had It So Good" (Mayer, Perry) – 3:10 
 "When We Were One" (Mayer, Leida Snow) – 3:55 
 "Stay Tuned" (McDaniels, Perry) – 4:35

Personnel 
From the original liner notes:

 Nancy Wilson – vocals
 Blue Mitchell – flugelhorn solo
 Dave Grusin – piano, Fender Rhodes
 George Duke – piano, Fender Rhodes, Moog synthesizer, background vocals
 Hugh McCracken – guitar
 Jeff Miranoy – guitar
 Chuck Rainey – bass guitar
 Steve Gadd – drums
 Oliver C. Brown – percussion
 Eugene McDaniels – background vocals
 Morgan Ames – background vocals, arranger of background vocals
 Carolyn Willis – background vocals
 Jackie Ward – background vocals
 Lisa Roberts – background vocals
 Carla Bee – background vocals
 Afreeka Trees – background vocals
 Jim Gilstrap – background vocals

Technical personnel
 Eugene McDaniels – producer
 Larkin Arnold – executive producer
 John Mayer – production assistant
 Dave Grusin – arranger
 George Duke – arranger ("China")
 Hugh McCracken – arranger ("When We Were One")
 Roy Kohara – art director
 Mel Dixon – photographer

References 

1976 albums
Nancy Wilson (jazz singer) albums